Richview is a village in Washington County, Illinois, United States. The population was 253 at the 2010 census.

History
Richview was originally called "Richmond", and under the latter name was platted in 1839. The present name was adopted in 1852.

Geography
Richview is located at  (38.377884, -89.180095).

Demographics

As of the census of 2000, there were 308 people, 115 households, and 83 families residing in the village. The racial makeup of the village was 97.08% White, 0.65% African American, 0.32% Native American, 0.65% Asian, and 1.30% from two or more races. Hispanic or Latino of any race were 1.95% of the population.

There were 115 households, out of which 34.8% had children under the age of 18 living with them, 56.5% were married couples living together, 11.3% had a female householder with no husband present, and 27.0% were non-families. 20.9% of all households were made up of individuals, and 8.7% had someone living alone who was 65 years of age or older. The average household size was 2.68 and the average family size was 3.10.

In the village, the population was spread out, with 26.9% under the age of 18, 10.4% from 18 to 24, 26.9% from 25 to 44, 24.7% from 45 to 64, and 11.0% who were 65 years of age or older. The median age was 34 years. For every 100 females, there were 104.0 males. For every 100 females age 18 and over, there were 97.4 males.

The median income for a household in the village was $38,125, and the median income for a family was $39,000. Males had a median income of $30,875 versus $23,125 for females. The per capita income for the village was $15,546. About 4.9% of families and 8.8% of the population were below the poverty line, including 11.4% of those under the age of eighteen and 6.3% of those 65 or over.

History 
Richview was first formed in 1839. It gradually grew into a business center. It had five stores, two blacksmiths, one wagon shop, 3 physicians, and had a population around 600 people. It had also turned into a railroad town. It was one of 4 towns along the Illinois Central Railway. Eventually two towns would form, Old and New Richview, and together they had a population of around 1000. The two towns did congeal into one. Today Richview is a small village with only a population of about 250.

The town is also the home of the Richview Car and Bike show which is held every July.

Notable people 

 Zola Cooper (1904–1954), cancer researcher, born in Richview

References

Villages in Washington County, Illinois
Villages in Illinois